Kim Sang-ok (김상옥, January 5, 1890 – January 22, 1923) was an independence activist in South Korea. With the March 1st Movement taking place, he organized a secret reform group with comrades from Yun Ik-jung and Shin Hwa-soo.

He returned to Korea in 1921 and carried out the mission of collecting military funds and spying for the country. In the winter of 1922, he entered Seoul with his comrades, Ahn Hong-han and Oh Bok-young, carrying weapons such as bombs, pistols, and live ammunition.

On Jan. 22, 1923, Kim ran around the roof of a civilian house surrounded by some 1,000 Japanese military police officers in Hyoje-dong, central Seoul, and fought a three-hour gun battle before killing himself with one remaining bullet.

Life 
At the age of 20, Dongheung Night School was established and the education movement began by Kim Sang Ok. He discussed issues related to national independence with Lee Jong-so and Lim Yong-ho.

When March 1st Movement took place, he organized an innovation group with his comrades and promoted the spirit of independence by publishing and distributing <Innovation Notice>. And in the spring of 1920, he met Kim Dong-soon, who came in from Manchuria, and planned to launch an independence movement with direct action, including the formation of an assassination squad to destroy the enemy's institutions.

He later defected to Shanghai, China, in October that year and avoided tracing by Japanese police that year. There, he developed a struggle for national independence by interacting with the governors of China through guidance and introduction of temporary government factors such as Kim Gu and Lee Si-young.

He returned to Korea in 1921, raised military funds and carried out espionage missions, and entered Seoul with his comrades in the winter of 1922.

Then on Jan. 12 the following year, he was in hiding after throwing a bomb at the Jongno Police Station and died on Jan. 22 after a long battle with Japanese soldiers.

References 

1890 births
1923 suicides
South Korean activists
Suicides by firearm in Korea
1923 deaths